Pierre Louis André Fauvel (8 October 1866, in Cherbourg – 12 September 1958, in Angers) was a French zoologist, who specialized in the study of polychaetes.

He worked as a préparateur of zoology at the faculty of sciences in Caen, and in 1897 received his doctorate at the Sorbonne with a thesis on Ampharetidae. During the same year, he became a professor of zoology at the Université Catholique de l'Ouest in Angers, where he remained until his retirement in 1951.

The polychaete family Fauveliopsidae bears his name, as does the genus Fauveliopsis. Along with his many writings on Polychaeta, he was also the author of publications in the fields of physiology and dietetics.

His zoological author abbreviation is Fauvel. For taxa he authored, see :Category:Taxa named by Pierre Fauvel, and this query.

Selected works
Recherches sur les Ampharétiens, 1897 – Research on Ampharetidae.
Sur les stades Clymenides et Branchiomaldane des arenicoles, 1899 – On the genera Clymenides and Branchiomaldane of Arenicolidae.
Polychètes errantes, 1923 – Wandering polychaetes.
Polychètes sédentaires; addenda aux errantes, archiandélides, myzostomaires, 1927 – Sedentary polychaetes. 
Annélides polychètes de Nouvelle-Calédonie et des îles Gambier, 1947 – Polychaete annelids of New Caledonia and the Gambier Islands.
Annelida Polychaeta 1953, in: "The Fauna of India".

References

1866 births
1958 deaths
People from Cherbourg-Octeville
Academic staff of the University of Caen Normandy
Academic staff of the Catholic University of the West
French zoologists